Jos Daman (born 15 October 1945) is a Belgian archer. He competed in the men's individual event at the 1972 Summer Olympics.

References

1945 births
Living people
Belgian male archers
Olympic archers of Belgium
Archers at the 1972 Summer Olympics
Sportspeople from Mechelen